Parir te Karogh Es (Պարիր թե կարող ես in original Armenian orthography, and translated as So You Think You Can Dance) is an Armenian televised dance competition based on the format of the international So You Think You Can Dance television franchise. Broadcast by Armenian television network Shant TV and hosted by Grikor Aghakhanyan, it began airing in 2011 and has been broadcast for three seasons. The first two seasons of the show had a single winner, while the third season had both a male and a female winner. The show's second-season winner, Paul Karmiriyan, subsequently entered the U.S. version of So You Think You Can Dance, and placed in the Top 6 on its tenth season.

See also
Dance on television

References

So You Think You Can Dance
Dance competition television shows
Armenian reality television series
Non-American television series based on American television series
2011 Armenian television series debuts
2010s Armenian television series
Shant TV original programming